Seth Porter Ford (1817–1866) was an American physician in the Kingdom of Hawaii.

Life
Seth Porter Ford was born October 12, 1817 in Washington, Connecticut.
His father was John Mansfield Ford (1785–1843) and mother was Polly Ann Calhoun (1796–1864).
He studied medicine from 1846 to 1847 at Yale University and published a book on inflammation there.

Ford married Maria N. Fowler on January 1, 1850. She was daughter of physician Remus M. Fowler.
The couple moved to Honolulu in 1852 from Boston. After trying to open two hospitals that were financial failures, his first wife returned to the US and he filed for divorce.
He was a founding member of the Hawaiian Medical Association in 1856.

He married Carolina (Carrie) Jackson in 1858. They had a daughter Lois Carrie Ford, who married first cousin Porter Dwight Ford in 1883.
Seth Porter Ford became a member of the Honolulu Rifles in 1864.
Ford died on November 19, 1866.

Jackson had just assumed ownership of a small island in Pearl Harbor known as Moku umeume in the Hawaiian language.
It was then known as Ford Island, and became the home of the Naval Auxiliary Landing Field Ford Island.

References

External links
 

People from Washington, Connecticut
1817 births
1866 deaths
Physicians from Hawaii
Yale School of Medicine alumni
Hawaiian Kingdom people